Double helix may refer to:

Science and engineering 
 Double helix, the structure of DNA
 Double helix (geometry), two helices with the same axis differing by a translation along the axis
 Double Helix Nebula, a gaseous nebula in the Milky Way Galaxy
 Double helical gear, also known as a herringbone gear
 The Helix Bridge, a bridge shaped as the double helix located at the Marina Bay, Singapore, Singapore

Gaming and animation 
 Double Helix Games, a video game developer
 Soldier of Fortune II: Double Helix, a video game
 Double-Helix, an alien race in the Wing Commander (franchise) 
 Doublehelix, a character in the animated film Asterix and the Vikings

Literature 
 The Double Helix, a book about the discovery of the double-helical structure of DNA
 Double Helix (novel), a 2004 novel by Nancy Werlin
 Star Trek: Double Helix, a six-book miniseries and a spinoff of the Star Trek: The Next Generation book series
 Double Helix: Double or Nothing, a book in the aforementioned series

Other uses 
 Double Helix (music composition), a 1991 piece for jazz orchestra by Jack Cooper
 Double Helix (database), a database management system for the Apple Macintosh computer system
 "Double Helix" (The Outer Limits), a 1997 television episode
 Double Helix Corporation, a non-profit media organization in St. Louis, Missouri, US
 "Double Helix", a song by Death Grips from The Money Store